Spiritpact (Standard Chinese: 灵契, Pinyin: Ling Qi) is a Chinese web manhua by Pingzi and published by Tencent on Tencent Comic. A donghua adaptation written by Reiko Torii and directed by Li Haoling was released in China online from June 21 to November 1, 2016. The series aired in Japan between 7 January 2017 and 11 March 2017 on Tokyo MX. It was streamed by Crunchyroll outside of Asia.

Characters
You Keika (Chinese: 杨敬华, pinyin: Yang Jinghua)
 (Japanese), Li Lanling (Chinese)
He is the heir of an old and famous exorcist. He is direct descendants of You Nei and is able to wield the sword Rakugetsu. Ever since his parents died, he lived a life of poverty. Soon after, he worked part-time as a fortune teller and computer recovery to make money. One night, in the junkyard he meets Tanmoku-ki fighting an evil spirit. After their meeting, he unfortunately died in an accident and became a spirit. Soon after, he is asked by Tanmoku-ki to form a "pact" with him. You Keika becomes a spirit shadow of Tanmoku-ki.
He is a carefree character, but is quite emotional at times. Initially very weak and unable to fight, he gains power later in the series, and is called The Most Powerful Spirit Shadow. Once he learns more about Ki, he proclaims his loyalty and resolves to protect Ki at all costs.

Tanmoku Ki (Chinese: 端木熙, pinyin: Duanmu Xi)
 (Japanese), Liu Mingyue (Chinese)
He is the 13th Youmeshi and head of the Tanmoki, the most powerful exorcist family and a descendant of Tanmoku Rakugetsu. Being an illegitimate child, he is called in by the main family after his parents died. He formed a "pact" with You Keika. He always protects You Keika from people, going so far as to pass an order that no one is to punish Keika, even if he kills him. He also gives Rakugetsu (the sword) to Keika. His fiancée is Shin Shiyou.

Immediately after Keika's death, he saw Rakugetsu's spirit emerge and makes a bet with him that if he prevents Keika's soul from breaking for a year, then Rakugetsu will stop.

Ki has a rather cold personality with all the people around him, including his grandmother, who is his only ally in the household and even his fiance; but strangely, he cares very much about Keika. He has very strong spiritual power. To keep this body pure from impurities, he doesn't partake meat, and also keeps himself free from wounds, as he can't have blood transfusions even if he is severely injured. As a child, he had gotten a scratch from Rakugetsu, which sealed a little of his power, but he gets it all back when Rakugetsu is finally sheathed. He even has to wear an earring so that his overwhelming power is controlled.

Shin Shiyou (Chinese: 秦詩瑤, pinyin: Qin Siyao)

A spiritualist and a holder of Nenyou constitution. Shiyou was chosen as the fiancée of Tanmoku Ki due to her powers that can heal the Youmeishi. Knowing that the spirit shadow will have a close relationship with his master, she is jealous of Keika, as Ki is always cold towards her. Even so, she trusts Keika and calls him the strongest spirit shadow. She is fiercely loyal to Ki, supports him and understands that he toils with his position.

Intetsu (Chinese: 寅哲, pinyin: Yinzhe)

Demon Master of Mount Ura and the spirit shadow of a former Youmeshi. Initially, he antagonizes You Keika, trying to make him usurp his position. But after his powers awaken, he deems himself no match to Keika and leaves him alone, though after making Keika promise to protect Ki. He is also bound to the Mount Ura, and cannot leave its boundaries. He also claims to have rights to all the Youmeshi.

Kau

Obaa-sama

Ki's grandmother, also Jimei's grandmother. She is the matriarch of the family, and her words are final. Normally of a kind disposition, he becomes tough when family matters are concerned. She is the one who appointed Ki as the head of the family, and still stubbornly refuses to transfer the charge to Jimei, no matter how dire the situation.

Shito Ritsu (Chinese: 司徒律, pinyin: Situ Lü)

He is a spirit master, who excels in controlling spirits. He bears a strong grudge against Ki, although the reasons are not clearly known - sometimes, he gives childish reasons like looks and other times, he mentions that it is because Ki killed his two most precious people. He tried to get Ki's birth date from Keika, almost breaking apart his spirit (and thus almost killing him) so that he could kill Ki. Later, he also stops Ki and Keika from reaching the Tanmoki mansion, until he is defeated by Keika.

Shitsuji

Butler of the Tanmoki family. He is Ritsu's father. His later dismissed and sent out of the mansion along with his son for attacking Keika.

Tanmoku Jiyun (Chinese: 端木寺蕓, pinyin: Duanmu Siyun)

Legitimate daughter of the Tanmoki family. She doesn't seem to bear a grudge against Ki, but doesn't seem to be supporting either, only following the decision of the family head, her grandmother, that Ki is the next head of the family. She also holds considerable Youmeshi power, though not as much as Ki. She plots behind the curtains to somehow bring down Ki and get herself to be the next head.

Tanmoku Jimei (Chinese: 端木寺明, pinyin: Duanmu Siming)

Ki's half-brother and the Tanmoki family's secretary. He serves Ki as his job, but supports Jiyun from the shadows. He also has powers with him, and had used it to contain Keika at Jimei's command.

Tanmoku Rakugetsu (Chinese: 端木落月, pinyin: Duanmu Luoyue)

Ancestor of Tanmoku Ki. He was a powerful Youmeshi, who later became corrupted at heart. He spent most of him time with his servant, Shisei, whom he considered as family, but dismissed him in his later days. When he finally started killing civilians, he was sealed off by Shisei, using the sword Rakugetsu. However, when Keika dies, he is released from his seal, and he claims that he will be free to do whatever he wants once Keika's soul departs after seven days.
He is often shown with his eyes blindfolded by a white strip of cloth, sometimes even bleeding severely from both eyes. But in the last scene, he takes his blindfold to reveal a missing left eye.

You Nei/Shisei
A loyal servant of Tanmoku Rakugetsu. He was known as the one-armed spiritualist and feared even by the strongest demons, even if he was not hostile against them. He spent his days taking care of Rakugetsu until he was dismissed. He came back after Rakugetsu turned evil, to sealed Rakugetsu with the sword that he had created with his own arm. The sword later came to be known as Rakugetsu sword, and was passed dowm the Tanmoki family as family heirloom.

Episodes

Music
The opening theme song of the donghua is "MUGENDAI" ”无限大” by Yu Jiaoyan and the ending song is "Endless Stories" by RiyO.

References

External links
Official Japanese animated series website 
Spiritpact on Crunchyroll

2010s webcomics
2017 anime television series debuts
2018 anime television series debuts
Animated series based on comics
Anime-influenced animation
Chinese animated television series
Chinese webcomics
Crunchyroll anime
Haoliners Animation League
LGBT-related animated series
Manhua adapted into television series
Television shows based on manhua
Television shows based on webcomics
Tencent manhua
Tokyo MX original programming